Sacha Wainwright  (born 6 February 1972) is an Australian retired soccer defender who played for the Australia women's national soccer team  at the 2004 Summer Olympics. At the club level, she played for Canberra Eclipse.

See also
 Australia at the 2004 Summer Olympics

References

External links
 

1972 births
Living people
Australian women's soccer players
Place of birth missing (living people)
Footballers at the 2000 Summer Olympics
Footballers at the 2004 Summer Olympics
Olympic soccer players of Australia
Women's association football defenders
Australia women's international soccer players
1995 FIFA Women's World Cup players
2003 FIFA Women's World Cup players
ACT Academy of Sport alumni